World Radiography Day marks the anniversary of the discovery of X-rays in 1895. The purpose of this day is to raise public awareness of radiographic imaging and therapy, which play a crucial role in the diagnosis and the treatment of patients and, most importantly, ensuring radiation is kept to the minimum required, hence improving the quality of patient care.  The day is celebrated worldwide by various national radiographers' associations and societies, including Nigeria's Association of Radiographers of Nigeria, United Kingdom's Society of Radiographers (SoR), among others. The International Society of Radiographers and Radiological Technologists have celebrated 8 November as World Radiography Day since 2007. 'Radiographers Association of Madhya Pradesh(India)''' has celebrated this day since 1996 and the theme for this day was raised by '''Mr.Shivakant Vajpai''', Secretory of Madhya Pradesh Radiographers Association, also holding a designation of Radiation Safety Officer and Senior Radiographer in government of Madhya Pradesh, India.

References

See also
International Day of Radiology

November observances
X-rays